Phostensin is a protein that in humans is encoded by the KIAA1949 gene.

References

Further reading